Saint-Loubès (Gascon: Sent Lobés) is a commune in the Gironde department in Nouvelle-Aquitaine in southwestern France. The Assyriologist René Labat (1904–1974) was born in Saint-Loubès, as well as silent movie actor Max Linder (1883–1925).

Population

See also
Communes of the Gironde department

References

Communes of Gironde